Kurumankadu or Vavuniya 01 is a town in Vavuniya District, Sri Lanka. It is second-largest town in the district after Vavuniya. It is situated in the Jaffna, Mannar  Junction at Vavuniya.

Location
Its boundaries are to the north is Thandikkulam, to the east Kuddiyiruppu, the west Padanichipuliyankulam, and to the south Pandarikulam.

History
After the 20th century, the settlements began here. This place looked like a forest in before 19th century. The people who settled here arrived from Jaffna due to the Sri Lankan Civil War.

References

Towns in Vavuniya District
Vavuniya DS Division